Temperance Bell is an unincorporated community in Greene County, in the U.S. state of Georgia.

History
A variant name was "Temperance". A post office called Temperance was established in 1823, and remained in operation until 1833. The community was named for the fact a revival of the temperance movement took place at the town site.

References

Unincorporated communities in Georgia (U.S. state)
Unincorporated communities in Greene County, Georgia